Four Diamonds may refer to:

 Four Diamonds Fund, a charitable organization
 Four of Diamonds, a British girl group
 "The Four Diamonds", a 1972 fantasy short story by Chris Millard

See also

 "Four Little Diamonds"
 Four of diamonds